Guillan may refer to:

 Guillan, Burkina Faso, a village in Cassou Department, Ziro Province, Centre-Ouest, Burkina Faso
 Guillán River, a river in Cuenca Canton, Azuay Province, Ecuador

Grapes
 Gouais blanc, a white French grape variety also known as Guillan 
 Malbec, a red wine grape variety also known as Guillan
 Muscadelle, another white French wine grape that is also known as Guillan

See also
 Gilan (disambiguation)
 Gillan (disambiguation)
 Gilliam (disambiguation)
 Guillain (disambiguation)